Rivière du Nord is a river in the Nunavik, Hudson Bay watershed.

Tributaries of Hudson Bay
Rivers of Nord-du-Québec

fr:Rivière du Nord (Québec)